K-15 is a  north–south state highway in the U.S. State of Kansas. Originating at the Oklahoma state line as a continuation of State Highway 18 and continuing to the Nebraska state line where it continues as Nebraska Highway 15. Throughout Kansas, it is signed as the Eisenhower Memorial Highway due to its route through Abilene, where the Eisenhower Memorial Museum and Library is located.

Route description 
Then, it heads west for  where it again overlaps, this time with US-160.

At Winfield, K-15 follows US-77 west to Udall and then turns north then cuts through Mulvane. It then continues traveling north through Derby, finally joining I-135 and US-81 in Wichita.  K-15 is a multilane divided highway beginning immediately southeast of Mulvane at its intersection with K-53.  K-15 follows this four-lane alignment through both Mulvane and Derby until merging with I-135 in south Wichita.  

K-15 follows the I-135 alignment to US-50, where it exits after less than a mile onto Kansas Avenue (old US-81) in Newton. It goes through Newton and North Newton then continues north to US-56 in Marion County. It overlaps US-56 east for  then continues north through Durham before crossing K-4. It keeps heading towards Abilene, where it crosses I-70, and continues north to K-18.

K-15 overlaps K-18 another  before returning north and crossing US-24 at Clay Center. K-15 overlaps US-36 for  before returning north to end at the Nebraska border, becoming N-15.

The entire section within Winfield is maintained by the city. The entire  section of K-15 within Mulvane is maintained by the city. The entire  section within Derby is maintained by the city. The section of K-15 in Wichita from the south city limit to I-135 is maintained by the city. The section of K-15 in Newton from US-50 to the north city limit is maintained by the city. The entire  section within Abilene is maintained by the city. The entire  section within Clay Center is maintained by the city.

History
K-15 once split into two routes near Washington. The K-15W fork is the present-day routing of K-15, while K-15E was redesignated as part of K-148. Before 1988, the section of K-148 from the K-9/K-15 intersection to the Nebraska border was designated as K-15E and the section of K-15 from the K-9/K-148 intersection northward was designated as K-15W. Then in a May 2, 1988 resolution, K-148 was extended over the former K-15E and K-15W was renumbered to K-15. K-15 was the only state route in Kansas to fork in this manner.

Junction list

See also

 List of state highways in Kansas

References

External links

 Kansas Highway Maps: Current, Historic, KDOT

015
Transportation in Cowley County, Kansas
Transportation in Sumner County, Kansas
Transportation in Sedgwick County, Kansas
Transportation in Harvey County, Kansas
Transportation in Marion County, Kansas
Transportation in Dickinson County, Kansas
Transportation in Clay County, Kansas
Transportation in Washington County, Kansas